XHPY-FM is a radio station on 95.3 FM in Tepic, Nayarit. XHPY is owned by Radiorama and carries a pop/romantic format known as Stereo Vida.

History
XHPY received its concession on November 28, 1988.

References

Radio stations in Nayarit